Kikut Lighthouse is a lighthouse in the north of Poland on the Baltic Sea coast that is active since 1962. It is the highest light on Poland's coast.

The lighthouse is situated near the village Wisełka on the island of Wolin and can only be reached via footpaths, steep at the end.

History 
The lighthouse was built on the base of an ancient view tower, the Kiekturm. It is one of the few Polish lighthouses, which can't be visited. Its light is visible from the neighbouring island of Usedom.

The former lighthouse was built in 1826. This lighthouse was originally a 19th-century stone lookout tower. An upper level brick and a lantern were added and it was converted into a lighthouse in 1962. The lighthouse is located in Wolin National Park.

Height of building: 18.2 m
Height of fire: 91.5 m
Range of light white 16 smC
Characteristic [Iso W 10s] five seconds light – five seconds dark
Int. No.: C 2892

"Poland has at least 26 lighthouses on its Baltic coast and also many lighthouses on the inland waterway that extends from Świnoujście to Szczecin."

See also 

 List of lighthouses in Poland

References

External links 
 lighthousedigest.com
 Lighthouse pages from Anke and Jens, leuchtturmseiten.de 
 baken-net.de 
 Urząd Morski w Słupsku  

Lighthouses completed in 1826
Towers completed in 1840
Lighthouses in Poland
1826 establishments in Prussia